Eduard Stoyanov (Russian: Эдуард Стоянов; born 29 June 1972 in Ukraine) is a Ukrainian retired footballer.

References

Ukrainian footballers
Association football defenders
Living people
1972 births
FC Chornomorets Odesa players
SC Odesa players
FC Arsenal Kyiv players
FC Zorya Luhansk players
FC CSKA Kyiv players
FC Khimik Severodonetsk players